Peter Njuguna Gitau (born 1962) is a Kenyan politician. He belongs to the Party of National Unity and was elected to represent the Mwea Constituency in the National Assembly of Kenya since the 2007 Kenyan parliamentary election.

References

Living people
Party of National Unity (Kenya) politicians
Members of the National Assembly (Kenya)
1962 births